Mark M. Zandi  is an Iranian-American economist who is the chief economist of Moody's Analytics, where he directs economic research.

Zandi's research interests encompass macroeconomics, financial markets and public policy. He analyzes the economic impact of government spending policies and monetary policy response. A trusted advisor to policy makers, he has testified before Congress on the economic outlook, the nation's fiscal challenges, fiscal stimulus and financial regulatory reform. Zandi also publishes on mortgage finance reform and the determinants of foreclosure and personal bankruptcy. He was one of the first economists to warn of the financial crisis of 2008 in 2005.

Early life and education
Zandi was born in Atlanta, Georgia, and is of Iranian descent. The son of Professor Iraj Zandi, he grew up in Radnor, Pennsylvania.

Zandi received his B.S. in economics from The Wharton School of the University of Pennsylvania and a Ph.D. in economics from the University of Pennsylvania.

Career

Zandi was a regional economist at Chase Econometrics, prior to co-founding Economy.com in 1990. Moody's Corporation purchased Economy.com in 2005. Economy.com subsequently became part of Moody's Analytics, a subsidiary of Moody's Corporation.

As Chief Economist of Moody's Analytics, Zandi oversees the global economic forecast and directs the activities of the economic research team. He publishes his outlook for the economy monthly, produces research on key topics and conducts regular briefings for clients, businesses, corporate boards and  trade associations.

Zandi is a regular contributor to The Washington Post and The Philadelphia Inquirer.<ref>"Mark Zandi". The Philadelphia Inquirer. Retrieved October 14, 2016.</ref> and is a frequent guest on CBS Face the Nation, Fox Business, C-SPAN, CNBC, NPR, Meet the Press, CNN, and various other media outlets.

Zandi is on the board of directors of MGIC, the nation's largest private mortgage insurance company, and The Reinvestment Fund, a large CDFI that makes investments in disadvantaged neighborhoods.

Writings and research
In 2008, Zandi wrote the book Financial Shock: A 360° Look at the Subprime Mortgage Implosion, and How to Avoid the Next Financial Crisis and in 2012 he wrote Paying the Price: Ending the Great Recession and Beginning a New American Century.'' Zandi's analysis of the impact of an economic stimulus package on the United States economy was cited by Christina Romer and Jared Bernstein in their report on President Barack Obama's proposed American Recovery and Reinvestment Plan, which became the American Recovery and Reinvestment Act of 2009. Zandi has authored multiple studies and op-eds, including:

 Protecting Workers and Businesses in the COVID Crisis
 A Timely, Simple Idea to Boost Affordable Housing
 Solving The Student Debt Crisis: Increase Education Supply
 Pride and Protectionism: U.S. Trade Policy and Its Impact on Asia
 Fear the Robots? Better to Embrace them and Adjust
 A Better Economy Under Trump Seems Unlikely
 The Financial Crisis: Lessons for the Next One
 A General Theory of G-Fees
 Time for the Government to Reduce its Role in the Mortgage Business
 Gas Prices and the Economy
 Reforming Fannie and Freddie
 How the Great Recession Was Brought to an End
 Policymaking Through a Panic
 Where are the Regulators?

References

External links
Mark Zandi's homepage at Economy.com
Economy.com, part of Moody's Analytics

1959 births
American economists
American people of Iranian descent
Living people
Wharton School of the University of Pennsylvania alumni
Zandi family (United States)